Kate & Mim-Mim is a computer-animated television series for children created by husband-and-wife duo, Scott and Julie Stewart. Produced by Nerd Corps Entertainment in season 1 and later by DHX Media in season 2 with FremantleMedia Kids & Family, the first episode premiered on Disney Junior in the United States on December 19, 2014 until July 2, 2017 when Disney Junior lost the rights to air the series. The series also premiered in the United Kingdom on CBeebies on October 30, 2016.

The show focuses on the friendship and adventures of a little girl named Kate and her favorite toy, a plush bunny named Mim-Mim who go on daring adventures in the fictional world of Mimiloo.

Characters

Kate is the main protagonist. She is a 5-year-old girl who wears colored clothes and is best friends with a stuffed bunny named Mim-Mim. Kate is voiced by Maryke Hendrikse in North America and Jessica Hann in the UK.
Mim-Mim, a plush purple bunny, is Kate's best friend. Mim-Mim is voiced by Lee Tockar in North America and by Rob Foster in the UK.
Valerie is Kate's mother. Valerie is voiced by Nicole Oliver in North America and Joanna Ruiz in the UK.
Marco is Kate's father. Marco is voiced by David Godfrey in North America and Charlie Ryan in the UK.
Boomer is a blue creature, and Lily's younger brother. He is voiced by Maryke Hendrikse in North America and Joanna Ruiz in the UK.
Lily is a pink creature and Boomer's older sister. She is voiced by Tabitha St. Germain in North America and Jess Robinson in the UK.
Gobble is a giant brown badger, voiced by Brian Drummond in North America and Terrence Mann in the UK.
Tack is a orange-yellow creature, he is voiced by Matt Hill in North America and Charlie Ryan in the UK.

Broadcast 
Other international broadcasters that have picked up the series include DR (Denmark), SVT (Sweden), Clan (Spain), Panda (Portugal), Super RTL (Germany), Tiji (France), JimJam (Central and Eastern Europe) PBS (Thailand) and Okto (Singapore).

Episodes

Season 1 (2014-15)
Rip Roaring Race (1 September 2014)
The Need for Seed (2 September 2014)
Color Me Happy (3 September 2014)
Kittens and Mittens (4 September 2014)
Tail Tale (5 September 2014)
Mirror Mirror (8 September 2014)
Boomer Size (9 September 2014)
Mim Mim's Moon Mishap (10 September 2014)
Tee Hee Rex (11 September 2014)
Mega Music Maker (12 September 2014)
Lost Island (15 September 2014)
Flight of the Flowers (16 September 2014)
A Case of the Giggles (17 September 2014)
Hiccups and Night Fun (18 September 2014)
Cloud Castle (19 September 2014)
Snow Bowling (22 September 2014)
Valentine Friends (23 September 2014)
A Storybook Ending (24 September 2014)
Balloon Buddies (25 September 2014)
Twinkle Twinkle (26 September 2014)
Snifferific (29 September 2014)
Summer Funday Drive (30 September 2014)
Mega Mim (1 October 2014)
Kate the Great (2 October 2014)
Clean Sweep (3 October 2014)
Princess Kate (17 November 2014)
Lighter than Air (18 November 2014)
Gobble's Gift (19 November 2014)
A Christmas Wish (22 December 2014)
Babysitting Squoosh (5 January 2015)
Chilly the Snowman (6 January 2015)
The Curious Case of the Chamelippo (7 January 2015)
Bubble Subbli (8 January 2015)
Kate's Dragon Quest (9 January 2015)
Butterfly Flowers (12 January 2015)
Kate's Turtle Drive (13 January 2015)
Make up a Game Day (14 January 2015)
Lily's Café (15 January 2015)
Leapfrog Underdog (16 January 2015)
The Big Idea Box (19 January 2015)
Happy Mim Day (20 January 2015)
Super Kate (21 January 2015)
Boom Chicka Bees (22 January 2015)
The Mimiloo Zoo (23 January 2015)
A Bunch O'Boomers (4 May 2015)
Lily and the Unicorn (5 May 2015)
Small Wonders (6 May 2015)
Teenie Genie (7 May 2015)
Catch a Critter (8 May 2015)
Follow the Leader (11 May 2015)
Treasure of Tut-n-Bunny (12 May 2015)

Season 2 (2016-18)
 Bathtime For Boomer (18 April 2016)
 Mimiloo Express (19 April 2016)
 Jurassic Tee Hees (20 April 2016)
 Tack & the Beanstalk (21 April 2016)
 Mim-Mim's Eggscellent Easter (22 April 2016)
 Lilly's Ballet Recital (25 April 2016)
 Eggy Boomer (26 April 2016)
 Chariots of Fun (27 April 2016)
 Boomer's Blanky (28 April 2016)
 Boogedie Bear Hair (29 April 2016)
 Mimiloo Clubhouse (2 May 2016)
 The Fluff Between Your Ears (3 May 2016)
 Lights, Camera, Mim-Mim! (4 May 2016)
 The Sky Is Falling (5 May 2016)
 Friendship Day (6 May 2016)
 Octo-Mim (9 May 2016)
 Small Blunders (10 May 2016)
 Lunar or Later (11 May 2016)
 Sprite Lights (12 May 2016)
 Wild Boomer (13 May 2016)
 Grabby the Crab (16 May 2016)
 Secret Superhero (17 May 2016)
 Boomer's New Pet (18 May 2016)
 Gobble's Gizmos and Gadgets (19 May 2016)
 Little Kate Riding Hood (20 May 2016)
 Glowing Up (23 May 2016)
 Lil' Boo (24 May 2016)
 Boomer's Three Wishes (25 May 2016)
 Me and My Shadow (26 May 2016)
 Twirly Scouts (27 May 2016)
 Remember When? (5 June 2017)
 The Mimiloo Mystery Friend (6 June 2017)
 King Boomer (7 June 2017)
 So You Think You Can Trumpet (8 June 2017)
 Kate in Oz (9 June 2017)
 The Mimiloo Safari (12 March 2018)
 Baby Gobble (13 March 2018)
 Lucky Funny Bunny (14 March 2018)
 Mim-Mim on Ice (15 March 2018)
 Kate's Surprise (16 March 2018)
 Fun for Zoom Zoom (19 March 2018)
 Boomer's First Flight (20 March 2018)
 Tack's Obstacle Course (21 March 2018)
 Boomer's Masterpiece (22 March 2018)
 The Story of Tack (23 March 2018)

Awards 
In 2015, Kate & Mim-Mim was nominated for a Leo Award for Best Overall Sound in an Animation Program or Series (for the episode titled "Bunch O' Boomers").

References

External links 

 
 Kate and Mim-Mim on Disney Junior
 Kate and Mim-Mim on CBeebies

Reviews 
 

2014 Canadian television series debuts
2010s Canadian animated television series
2014 British television series debuts
2010s British animated television series
2010s British children's television series
Animated television series about children
Animated television series about rabbits and hares
British children's animated adventure television series
British children's animated fantasy television series
British computer-animated television series
Canadian children's animated adventure television series
Canadian children's animated fantasy television series
Canadian computer-animated television series
English-language television shows
Family Jr. original programming
Fictional duos
Television series by DHX Media
Television series by FremantleMedia Kids & Family
British preschool education television series
Canadian preschool education television series
Animated preschool education television series
2010s preschool education television series
CBeebies